The 2022–23 UAE President's Cup will be the 46th edition of the UAE President's Cup, Sharjah are the defending champions after beating Al Wahda in the final last season. This season will see a new competition format where all clubs from both Pro League and First Division compete in the knockout stage from the round of 32 to the final, the defending champions Sharjah will get a bye to the round of 16. The reason behind this is to cut schedule after the final of last season was postponed due to the Play off match against Australia.

Draw dates

Knockout round

Bracket

Round of 32
All times are local (UTC+04:00)

Round of 16

Quarter finals

Semi-finals

First leg

Second leg

References

UAE President's Cup seasons
President's Cup
2022–23 Asian domestic association football cups